"I Had Too Much to Dream (Last Night)" is a song written with music by Annette Tucker and lyrics by Nancie Mantz, which was recorded in late 1966 by the garage rock band The Electric Prunes. Released as the band's second single, it reached number 49 in the UK and peaked at number 11 on the Billboard Hot 100 the week ending February 11, 1967.

It was also the lead track of the band's debut album, and became more widely known as the opening track on the influential Nuggets compilation of garage rock and early psychedelic music, released in 1972.

The title is a play on words, namely on having "too much (alcohol) to drink": its lyrics describe how the singer has woken from dreaming about an ex-lover.

Origins of the song
The Electric Prunes originally formed as The Sanctions at Taft High School in Los Angeles, renaming themselves in 1966. They were introduced to record producer Dave Hassinger, and after a series of rehearsals at Leon Russell's house released a debut single, "Ain't It Hard". Despite its commercial failure, Reprise Records agreed that the band could record a second single.

Convinced that the band could not write their own songs, Hassinger sought material from the professional songwriting team of Annette Tucker and lyricist Nancie Mantz. One of the tunes was "I Had Too Much to Dream (Last Night)", a song that, according to some sources, was originally conceived as an orchestral piano ballad. However, according to Tucker, "I came up with the title one day and called Nancie. She loved it and we wrote it the next day in one half hour...The words were there and my melody came easily. I was influenced by the Rolling Stones at the time and that is how I heard that song being recorded...Nancie and I envisioned this as a rock song." A demo version recorded for Hassinger by singer-songwriter Jerry Fuller (in some sources wrongly identified as Jerry Vale), may have been the source of the story of the song's origin as a ballad.

At the time, the Electric Prunes comprised singer James Lowe, lead guitarist Ken Williams, rhythm guitarist James "Weasel" Spagnola, bassist Mark Tulin, and drummer Preston Ritter. The oscillating, reversed guitar which opens the song originated from the rehearsals at Russell's house, where Williams recorded with a 1958 Gibson Les Paul guitar with a Bigsby vibrato unit. According to Lowe, "We were recording on a four-track, and just flipping the tape over and re-recording when we got to the end. Dave cued up a tape and didn't hit 'record,' and the playback in the studio was way up: ear-shattering vibrating jet guitar. Ken had been shaking his Bigsby wiggle stick with some fuzztone and tremolo at the end of the tape. Forward it was cool. Backward it was amazing. I ran into the control room and said, 'What was that?' They didn't have the monitors on so they hadn't heard it. I made Dave cut it off and save it for later."

The single was released in November 1966. At first it was caught up in the Christmas rush, but in early 1967 it made steady progress up the US chart and finally peaked at #11. It also reached # 49 in the UK chart. Its success enabled the band to tour, and to release an album and a successful follow-up single "Get Me to the World on Time".

Other recordings
The song has also been recorded by other artists including Todd Tamanend Clark, Wayne County & the Electric Chairs, Stiv Bators, The Damned, The Vibrators, Doro Pesch, Paul Roland, Ulver, Deviled Ham and Webb Wilder. An Italian language version, "Sospesa Ad Un Filo", was recorded in 1967 by top Italian beat group I Corvi.

Personnel
 James Lowe – lead vocals, autoharp, rhythm guitar, tambourine
 Ken Williams – lead guitar
 James "Weasel" Spagnola – rhythm guitar, backing vocals
 Mark Tulin – bass guitar, piano, organ
 Preston Ritter – drums, percussion

References

External links
Critical article by Richie Unterberger
Interview with James Lowe

1966 singles
Reprise Records singles
Radar Records singles
Songs written by Annette Tucker
The Electric Prunes songs
American psychedelic rock songs
Songs about nightmares